HMMT is an annual high school math competition that started in 1998. The location of the tournament, in Cambridge, Massachusetts, alternates between Harvard University (November tournament) and MIT (February tournament).  The contest is written and staffed almost entirely by Harvard and MIT students.

Naming
HMMT was initially started as the Harvard-MIT Mathematics Tournament in 1998, and is frequently still referred to as such by much of the math community. In 2019, HMMT rebranded as just HMMT to meet requirements set forth by Harvard and MIT, making it an orphan initialism.

Tournament format 
HMMT February is attended by teams of eight students each.  Teams can represent a single school, or a regional math team as large as a state.  In recent years, teams have represented over 20 states, as well as Africa, Asia, Europe, and South America.

HMMT February consists of three rounds: the Individual Round, the Team Round, and the Guts Round.  No calculator or computational aids of any kind are allowed during the contest.

Individual Round 
The Individual Round comprises the Algebra, Geometry, and Combinatorics exams for February, and the General and Theme exams for November. Each of the exams is 50 minutes in length and contains 10 questions. The exams are short-answer, meaning that the answers can be any real number or even an algebraic expression. Before 2012, competitors had the option to choose between a General exam or two exams in Algebra, Geometry, Combinatorics, or Calculus for the February tournament.

Team Round
For the February Team Round, the eight-person teams compete together on a 60-minute-long test.  The Team Round is a collaborative event with proof-style problems, sometimes arranged into groups of several problems on the same theme.  Thorough justifications are required for full credit. The Team Round is worth a total of 400 points, and problems are weighted according to difficulty. The event is similar to an ARML Power Round, but the problems are much harder and less numerous. This round is targeted at teams comfortable with rigorous mathematical proofs.

By contrast, the November Team Round is short answer style, similar to the individual rounds, but have slightly harder problems, and are worked on as a team.

Guts Round
The Guts Round is an 80-minute team event with 36 short-answer questions on an assortment of subjects, of varying difficulty and point values. Each team is seated in a predetermined spot, and the questions are divided into groups of four (in February) or three (in November). At the starting signal, each team sends a runner to an assigned problem station to pick up copies of the first set of four problems for each team member. As soon as a team has answers for one problem set, the runner may bring the answers to the problem station and pick up the next set. It is not expected that students will finish all the problems. Grading is immediate and scores are posted in real time, resulting in an exciting atmosphere for the competitors. The Guts round is worth a total of approximately 400 points.

Other events
HMMT February and November also feature events on the Friday evening prior to the tournament.  Some of these events include a dinner and social for students and coaches, and Mini-Events such as math talks about famous problems and math-related games.

The top 50 competitors at HMMT February are also invited to compete in the Invitational Competition (HMIC), which is a five-question four-hour proof contest started in 2013. The problems are typically quite difficult: competitors can typically attain a high ranking by fully solving three problems.

Scoring and awards
HMMT February uses a unique scoring algorithm to rank the competitors on the Individual Rounds.  While the problems on these tests are weighted according to difficulty, they are done so after the testing has completed.  As explained here,  this helps create a very fair method for weighting problems according to their actual difficulty (as determined by how often and by whom they were solved) as opposed to their perceived difficulty prior to the tournament.  The weights assigned to each problem are calculated using a scoring algorithm that takes into account which problems were solved by which students.  The weights of the problems on the Team and Guts Rounds are given on the tests.

Prizes are given to the ten highest-scoring individuals overall, the top ten scorers on each of the subject rounds, the ten highest-scoring teams on the Team Round (A and B), and the ten highest-scoring teams on the Guts Round. The top ten teams overall will be named the Sweepstakes winners. The calculation of Sweepstakes scores is roughly half individual round performance and half collaborative round performance.

Difficulty
The difficulty of the competition is compared to that of ARML, the AIME, or the Mandelbrot Competition, though it is considered to be a bit harder than these contests.  The contest organizers state that, "HMMT, arguably one of the most difficult math competitions in the United States, is geared toward students who can comfortably and confidently solve 6 to 8 problems correctly on the American Invitational Mathematics Examination (AIME)."  As with most high school competitions, knowledge of calculus is not required; however, calculus may be necessary to solve a select few of the more difficult problems on the Individual Rounds.

Results
The results of HMMT February can be seen below:

HMMT November
HMMT November has been held since 2008 for teams of six students. Students are required to come from the United States to participate, and no student may compete in both November and February in a given school year. The tournament is similar in style to HMMT February, and is organized by the same Harvard and MIT students. Instead of three topic tests, HMMT November has two Individual Rounds: a General Test (ten questions from Algebra, Geometry, and Combinatorics) and a Theme Test (ten questions, many of which are tied together by a common theme). Additionally, the Team Round is entirely short answer, instead of proof-based.  HMMT November is considered to be an easier alternative to HMMT February. The results of HMMT November can be seen below:

Sponsors
HMMT is typically sponsored by a combination of school math departments and various industry companies. The full list, which changes annually, can be found on the HMMT homepage.

Other competitions

HMMT hosts staff exchange programs with the Princeton University Mathematics Competition (PUMaC) and Carnegie Mellon Informatics and Mathematics Competition (CMIMC) to further collaboration between the competitions' organizers. During exchanges, participants ranging from first-year members to more senior officers spend the weekend proctoring, grading, and otherwise volunteering at the host competition day-of.

References

External links
 Official website

Mathematics competitions
Recurring events established in 1998